São Bartolomeu (Portuguese for Saint Bartholomew) may refer to the following places:

in Portugal
 São Bartolomeu (Borba), a civil parish in the municipality of Borba
 São Bartolomeu (Coimbra), a civil parish in the municipality of Coimbra 
 São Bartolomeu (Vila Viçosa), a civil parish in the municipality of Vila Viçosa
 São Bartolomeu de Regatos, a civil parish in the municipality of Angra do Heroísmo, Azores
 São Bartolomeu dos Galegos, a civil parish in the municipality of Lourinhã
 São Bartolomeu de Messines, a civil parish in the municipality of Silves

in Brazil
 São Bartolomeu River, a river in Goiás state